The Victor class, Soviet designations Project 671 Yorsh, Project 671RT Syomga and Project 671RTM/RTMK Shchuka, (NATO reporting names Victor I, Victor II and Victor III, respectively), are series of nuclear-powered attack submarines built in the Soviet Union and operated by the Soviet Navy. Since the 1960s, 48 units were built in total, of which the last remaining are currently in service with the Russian Navy. The Victor-class submarines featured a teardrop shape, allowing them to travel at high speed. These vessels were primarily designed to protect Soviet surface fleets and to attack American ballistic missile submarines. Project 671 began in 1959 with the design task assigned to SKB-143 (one of the  predecessors of the Malakhit Marine Engineering Bureau).

Versions

Project 671 Yorsh (Victor I)

Soviet designation Project 671 Yorsh (ruffe)—was the initial type that entered service in 1967; 16 were produced. Each had six torpedo tubes for launching Type 53 torpedoes and SS-N-15 anti-submarine missiles and mines could also be released. Subs had a capacity of 24 tube-launched weapons or 48 mines (or a combination). All disposed.

Project 671RT Syomga (Victor II)

Soviet designation Project 671RT Syomga (atlantic salmon)—entered service in 1972; seven were produced in the 1970s. These were originally designated Uniform class by NATO. They had similar armament to the Victor I class and were the first Soviet submarines to introduce raft mounting for acoustic quieting. Production was truncated due to a decision to develop the improved Victor III class. All disposed.

Project 671RTM/RTMK Shchuka (Victor III)

Soviet designation Project 671RTM/RTMK Shchuka (pike)—entered service in 1979; 25 were produced until 1991. Quieter than previous Soviet submarines, these ships had four tubes for launching SS-N-21 or SS-N-15 missiles and Type 53 torpedoes, plus another two tubes for launching SS-N-16 missiles and Type 65 torpedoes. 24 tube-launched weapons or 36 mines could be on board. The Victor III class caused a minor furor in NATO intelligence agencies at its introduction because of the distinctive pod on the vertical stern-plane. Speculation immediately mounted that the pod was the housing for some sort of exotic silent propulsion system, possibly a magnetohydrodynamic drive unit. Another theory proposed that it was some sort of weapon system. K-324 was forced to surface, allowing NATO forces to photograph the pod in its deployed state. The Victor-III class was continuously improved during construction and late production models have a superior acoustic performance.

Units

Incidents

 In 1981  collided with a Victor III-class submarine—K-324—while attempting to photograph the odd pod on the back. The event was covered up by the Reagan Administration and never made public, though it nearly cost the lives of the sailors on USS Drum. The incident was declassified and disclosed by the Clinton Administration in February 1993. 
 On 21 March 1984, K-314 collided with the aircraft carrier  in the Sea of Japan. Neither ship was significantly damaged.
 The Soviet cargo ship Bratstvo collided with the Soviet submarine K-53 of the Victor I-class in position Latitude 35 deg 55 min North and Longitude 005 deg 00 min West, at the exit from the Gibraltar Strait in Alboran Sea, on 18 (as per ship's time) or 19 (as per submarine time) September 1984.
 On 6 September 2006, the Victor III-class Daniil Moskovskiy suffered an electronics fire while in the Barents Sea, killing two crew members. The boat was 16 years old and was overdue for overhaul. It was towed back to Vidyayevo. She continued to serve into the latter 2010s and was reportedly formally decommissioned on 28 October 2022.

In media
 A depiction of a Victor III-class submarine (Valentin Zukovsky's nephew Nikolai's own submarine) was used prominently  in the James Bond film The World Is Not Enough as a key element in the film's antagonists (Elektra King and Viktor "Renard" Zokas) plan.

See also
 List of submarine classes in service
 Future of the Russian Navy

References

External links

Victor-class at National Geographic
NATO Code Names for Submarines and Ships at Aerospace Page of Andreas Gehrs-Pahl
Victor I at Encyclopedia of Ships 
Victor II at Encyclopedia of Ships 
Victor III at Encyclopedia of Ships 
Victor III-class submarines - Complete Ship List at Russian-Ships.info
Fire breaks out aboard Northern Fleet nuclear sub, killing 2 at Bellona.org

 
Russian and Soviet navy submarine classes
Submarine classes
Nuclear-powered submarines